Liborio Solís (born 21 March 1982) is a Venezuelan professional boxer who held WBA super flyweight title in 2013. He also challenged once for the WBC bantamweight title in 2016 and twice for the WBA bantamweight title in 2016 and 2017.

Professional career

Solis vs. Salgado 
On 10 December 2011, Solís defeated José Salgado by twelfth round split decision for the interim WBA Super Flyweight title.

Solis vs. Kono 
On 6 May 2013, Solis defeated Kohei Kono by twelfth round majority decision to win the WBA Super Flyweight title.

Solis vs. Kameda 
Solís then fought Daiki Kameda in a unification bout where both Solis's WBA Super Flyweight title and Kameda's IBF Super Flyweight title were on the line. However, Solis failed to make weight, meaning he lost his WBA World title on the scales. Both titles were at stake for Kameda only, but even if he lost, he would still retain his IBF title. Solis won the bout by split decision.

Solis vs. Rigondeaux 
Rigondeaux beat Liborio Solis by split decision in their 12 round contest on 8th February, 2020, at PPL Center in Pennsylvania for the vacant WBA bantamweight championship of the world. The scorecards read 112-115, 116-111, 115-112 in favor of winner Rigondeaux.

Professional boxing record

See also

List of super-flyweight boxing champions

References

External links

Liborio Solis - Profile, News Archive & Current Rankings at Box.Live

1982 births
Living people
Super-flyweight boxers
Bantamweight boxers
World super-flyweight boxing champions
World Boxing Association champions
Sportspeople from Maracay
Venezuelan male boxers